Sapucaia may refer to:

Botany
Lecythis pisonis, a tree of the family Lecythidaceae, also known as cream nut or monkey pot
, a tree of the family Malvaceae, also known as chicá-do-cerrado

Geography
Sapucaia, Pará, a municipality in the state of Pará;
Sapucaia, Rio de Janeiro, a municipality in the state of Rio de Janeiro;
Sapucaia do Sul, a municipality in the state of Rio Grande do Sul